Mrs. Mop is a patience or solitaire card game which is played using two decks of playing cards. Invented by Charles Jewell, it is a relative of the solitaire game Spider in which all of the cards are dealt face up at the beginning of the game. The game seems easy at first, but when played, winning is difficult and it is rare to be able to complete the game successfully.

Rules
First the cards are dealt into thirteen columns of eight cards each. The player will then aim to form eight full suit sequences of 13 cards each. Every sequence should run from King down to Ace.

To achieve this, the cards are built down regardless of suit. One card can be moved at a time, unless there are two or more cards of the same suit forming a sequence (such as ♠7-6-5-4) at which case they are moved as a single unit.  Because all the cards are visible at the outset, Mrs Mop is arguably one of the most skill-based rather than luck-based solitaire games.

When a suit sequence is formed on the same column, running from King down to Ace (such as ♣K-Q-J-10-9-8-7-6-5-4-3-2-A), the sequence is discarded. This game is won when all eight such sequences are removed.

Like in Spider, it is generally a good idea for the player to build down in suit whenever possible because the earlier this is done, the sooner a sequence is removed, giving the player more space to maneuver.

If you can make a couple of spaces you can sort many non-suit sequences into suit sequences.  Making four spaces pretty much guarantees a win. Finding columns all of whose cards can be built on others is therefore a good tactic.

References 
 Arnold, Peter. Card Games For One
 Parlett, David.  The Penguin Book of Patience

See also
 Spider
 List of solitaire games
 Glossary of solitaire terms

Open packers
Double-deck patience card games